The 1975 World Taekwondo Championships are the 2nd edition of the World Taekwondo Championships, and were held in Seoul, South Korea from August 28 to August 31, 1975. A total of 165 athletes from 30 nations took part in the championships.

Medal summary

Medal table

References

WTF Medal Winners

External links
WT Official Website

World Championships
World Taekwondo Championships
World Taekwondo Championships
International taekwondo competitions hosted by South Korea
Sport in Seoul
Taekwondo competitions in South Korea